The 20801 / 20802 Magadh Express is a superfast train running between New Delhi and . Its number is 20801/20802 and it departs from Islampur and reaches New Delhi the following day. In the past, its number was 2401/2402 and was run from the Northern Railway zone. Now it is run as a train from South Eastern Railway zone. Earlier a train named Sonbhadra Express used to run between Patna to New Delhi and vice versa. It was converted to Magadh Express after combining it with Vikramshila Express.

Schedule 

 20801 MAGADH EXPRESS departs New Delhi every night at 21:05 IST (09:05 PM) and reaches Islampur on the next evening 15:25 IST (03:25 PM). It takes 18 hours 20 minutes 

 20802 MAGADH EXPRESS departs Islampur every afternoon 15:32 IST (03:32 PM) and reaches New Delhi next noon at 11:50 IST (11:50 AM). It takes 20 hours 18 minutes

Route & Halts

Traction

Both trains are hauled by a Gomoh Loco Shed based WAP-7 locomotive on its entire journey.

Coaches 

This train has 22 LHB coach which has the maximum speed of 130 kmph. This rake consists,

1 First AC (H1)
1 AC Two Tier (A1)
5 AC Three Tier (B1 to B5)
9 Sleeper (S1 to S9)
4 Unreserved coaches

Accident
In an accident due to dense fog on 2 January 2010, the Lichchavi Express collided with the stationary Magadh Express train at the station near the city of Etawah, about 170 miles (270 kilometers) southwest of Lucknow. Ten people, including the driver of one of the trains, were injured.

In January 2018, the engine of the Magadh Express caught fire between stations–Twining Ganj and Raghunathpur – on Mughalsarai–Patna rail section of Danapur division. Railway officials reported no injuries or deaths amongst passengers. It was largely due to the loco pilot's prompt action in extinguishing the fire within moments of having witnessed it, for which the man received praise.

References

External links
 Magadh Express route map

Transport in Delhi
Express trains in India
Rail transport in Bihar
Rail transport in Uttar Pradesh
Rail transport in Delhi
Railway services introduced in 2010
Named passenger trains of India